Robert Halsall Abel (born May 27, 1941 in Painesville, Ohio, died April 14, 2017 in Hadley, Massachusetts) was an American short story writer, and novelist.

Career
Abel graduated from College of Wooster cum laude in 1964 with a B.A., Kansas State University with a M.A. in 1967, and the University of Massachusetts, with an MFA in 1974. In 1968, he signed the "Writers and Editors War Tax Protest" pledge, vowing to refuse tax payments in protest against the Vietnam War.

His work appeared in Colorado Review, Dim Sum, Glimmer Train, Manoa, The Massachusetts Review, Mind's Eye, and Writers' Forum. He was a member of the Authors Guild.

He died at his home in Hadley, Massachusetts on April 14, 2017.

Awards
 1991 Flannery O'Connor Award for Short Fiction
 1978 National Endowment for the Arts Creative Writing Fellowship

Works
 
  (reprint: Soho Press October 2002)
 
 
 
  (reprint 1980)

Criticism

References

External links

1941 births
2017 deaths
People from Painesville, Ohio
20th-century American novelists
20th-century American male writers
American tax resisters
University of Massachusetts Amherst alumni
College of Wooster alumni
Kansas State University alumni
American male novelists
American male short story writers
20th-century American short story writers
People from Hadley, Massachusetts